You Don't Mess Around with Jim is the third studio album by American singer-songwriter Jim Croce, released in April 1972 by ABC Records.

History and release
The album was recorded over a three to four-week period for approximately $18,000, with most funding coming from the PolyGram Group in Baarn, the Netherlands, on the basis of hearing an 8-song demo tape assembled by production team Cashman & West. The deal with PolyGram was made after team attorney Phil Kurnit approached a contact within the record company who then had PolyGram executives listen to the demo tape.
After having the finished album rejected by up to 40 record labels, Croce was signed to ABC Records after Cashman & West had a chance meeting with ABC promotion man Marty Kupps. Kupps urged label head Jay Lasker to sign Croce after hearing cuts from a cassette tape of the finished album.

The record spent 93 weeks on the charts, longer than any other Jim Croce album. Due to the strong performance of the posthumous single release "Time in a Bottle" (#1 pop, No. 1 AC), You Don't Mess Around with Jim was the best selling album in the U.S. for five weeks in early 1974. It was listed at No. 6 on the 1974 Cash Box year-end album charts. Two singles were originally released from the album in 1972: the title track (#8 pop) and "Operator (That's Not the Way It Feels)" (#17 pop).

The album was issued on CD by the Rhino Flashbacks record label on September 30, 2008.

Tracks

The lyrics of the title track concern the fate of a 'pool-shooting son-of-a-gun' by the name of 'Big' Jim Walker when his 'mark', Willie 'Slim' McCoy, from South Alabama, shows up to get a refund from being hustled or get revenge.  The song is notable for the line, "You don't tug on Superman's cape/You don't spit into the wind/You don't pull the mask off that ol' Lone Ranger/And you don't mess around with Jim."  However, after the song ends with Jim being thoroughly thrashed by his victim ("he'd been cut 'n 'bout a hundred places/ and he'd been shot in a couple more"), the chorus now goes, "You don't mess around with Slim."

Track listing

Notes

A  Tracks 1–12 correspond to the original 1972 album

Personnel
Jim Croce – guitar, rhythm guitar, lead vocals, backing vocals
Maury Muehleisen – lead acoustic guitar, backing vocals
The Briggs – backing vocals
Terry Cashman – backing vocals on "Operator (That's Not the Way It Feels)"
Tommy West – bass, percussion, piano, rhythm guitar, keyboards, electric piano, backing vocals
Harry Boyle – guitar on "Hey Tomorrow"
Joe Macho – bass
Jim Ryan – bass on "Box #10"
Gary Chester – drums
Ellie Greenwich, Tasha Thomas – backing vocals
Peter Dino – arrangements
Technical
Bruce Tergesen – recording and mixing engineer
Paul Wilson – photography

Chart history

Certifications

References

Jim Croce albums
1972 albums
Albums produced by Terry Cashman
ABC Records albums
Vertigo Records albums